Sindre Walle Egeli (born 21 June 2006) is a Norwegian footballer who plays as a forward for Danish side Nordsjælland.

Club career
Born in Larvik, Egeli spent his youth career between the academies of Nanset IF and Sandefjord. On his debut for Sandefjord 2, he scored all five goals in a 5–0 win against Teie in the 4. divisjon. An incredibly prolific striker at youth and reserve level, he was likened to fellow Norwegian footballer Erling Haaland.

In February 2022, it was announced that Egeli would move to Denmark to join the academy of Danish Superliga side Nordsjælland.

International career
Egeli has represented Norway at under-15 and under-16 level. He continued his prolific club form for both national teams, scoring a six-minute hat-trick against Armenia in qualification for the 2023 UEFA European Under-17 Championship.

Personal life
Egeli is the brother of fellow professional footballer Vetle Walle Egeli.

Career statistics

Club

Notes

References

External links
 

2006 births
Living people
People from Larvik
Norwegian footballers
Norway youth international footballers
Association football forwards
Norwegian Fourth Division players
Sandefjord Fotball players
FC Nordsjælland players
Norwegian expatriate footballers
Norwegian expatriate sportspeople in Denmark
Expatriate footballers in Denmark